Karen Knutsen is a shuttle tanker built in 1999. It was originally named Knock Whillan flying a Liberian flag. On 15 July 2003 it was renamed Karen Knutsen and reflagged to Isle of Man on 22 December 2003. Its home port is Douglas. It is owned by Knutsen O.A.S. Shipping AS and managed by KNOT Management AS.

History
The ship was originally ordered on 4 April 1997. The keel was laid on 25 August 1998 in yard number 1125 by Hyundai Heavy Industries in Ulsan, South Korea. The launch took place on 4 December 1998, and it was completed on 18 March 1999.

Description

Karen Knutsen has an overall length of 273.95 metres, an LPP of 264.0 metres, and is 50 metres wide. It has a gross tonnage of 88,109 tons and deadweight of 145,000 tons. This ship can travel at a speed of approximately 14.7 knots. The draught is about 16.02 metres.

References

External links

Current location at vesselfinder.com
Current location at marinetraffic.com
Voyage log

1998 ships
Ships built by Hyundai Heavy Industries Group
Tankers of Liberia
Merchant ships of the Isle of Man